Fartha is a small townland in the south eastern side of County Cavan, Ireland, in the parish of Knockbride. It is made up mostly of grassland and has a  lake known as Fartha Lough with two streams flowing from it.

The townland of Fartha has few families living there. It is mainly made up of the Boyle, Costigan, Drury, Martin and Shanley families. Its population in 2017 was 22, compared with 91 in the 1901 census.

See also
Fartha, County Cork

Townlands of County Cavan